Joseph Casey is the name of:

Joseph E. Casey (1898–1980), U.S. Congressman from Massachusetts
Joseph H. Casey (1918–2010), Nova Scotia politician
Joseph M. Casey (1827–1895), Iowa state legislator
Joseph Casey (congressman) (1814–1879), U.S. Congressman from Pennsylvania

See also
Joe Casey (disambiguation)